Wonderful One is the fifth overall album of gospel singer Vanessa Bell Armstrong, and second for major label Jive Records.

Having penetrated the mainstream market with the previous year's singles "You Bring Out The Best In Me" and "Pressing On," the artist continued the trend with the singles "I'm Coming Back" and a cover of the Labi Siffre anti-Apartheid anthem "Something Inside So Strong." Armstrong would later reprise her performance on the song as part of a multi-artist tribute to civil rights activist Rosa Parks.

Track listing 
 Something Inside So Strong (4:51)
 Tell The World (4:32)
 True Love Never Fails (duet with Jonathan Butler) (4:49)
 Wonderful One (4:32)
 I'm Coming Back (4:45)
 Count On Your Love (4:44)
 You Make Me Wanna Love Again (4:47)
 Without You (4:47)
 What Shall I Render (5:25)

External links 
 
 Vanessa Bell Armstrong on Discogs.com

Vanessa Bell Armstrong albums
1989 albums